Carol Janeway (born Caroline Bacon Rindsfoos) (1913-1989) was a noted American ceramicist active in New York City in the 1940s and 1950s.

Career 
The main venue for her ceramics was Georg Jensen Inc. from 1942 -1949, while Gimbels, I. Magnin, Gumps and other stores also sold her wares. She had three successive studios in Greenwich Village until the early 1950s when she worked out of her home in Milligan Place in Greenwich Village. She was featured in a 1945 issue of Life Magazine for her work with ceramic tiles.

In 1947 Janeway was asked to submit designs for the noted British manufacturer Josiah Wedgwood & Sons however the firm did not put the designs into production. Two such Janeway plates appeared in the 1948 Wedgwood exhibition at the Brooklyn Museum.

She designed and produced a line of ceramic chess, backgammon, and checker sets. Of the 32 artists invited to exhibit in The Imagery of Chess, a dada-surrealist art event at the Julien Levy Gallery from December 1944 to January 1945, she was one of two female artists whose chess sets were featured.

She decorated many tile fireplace surrounds installed mainly in the New York area.

Her how-to ceramics book, Ceramics and Potterymaking for Everyone, 
was published in 1950 by Tudor Publishing Company as a part of a series. Her pamphlet, Ceramic Brushes: their selection, use, and care, was published in 1952 by Delta Brush Mfg. Corp., New York.

News of her diagnosis of lead poisoning leading to her retirement appeared in a 1950 "Lyons Den" column.

Works by Janeway are held by few museums, despite claims in her obituary. These are the Cooper-Hewitt Smithsonian Design Museum in New York City and the Philadelphia Museum of Art which holds Janeway's papers in addition to some tile work.  Ceramic art by Janeway and additional papers were sold by her estate and are in a private collection.

Personal life 
Born Caroline Bacon Rindsfoos in her maternal grandparents' home in Brooklyn, she and the  family moved to Columbus, Ohio, in 1925 where her father, Charles Siesel Rindsfoos, joined his brother William in the Brunson Bank.  She eloped in 1932 with fellow Cornell student Eliot Janeway and kept the name after the failure of the marriage in 1934. She lived in London from 1933 through 1939 with various trips to Moscow, Paris, Capri. She studied lithography in London. In Moscow as a lithographer in 1935 she gave birth to her daughter, Helen Roe, renamed Kiske Janeway (1935-2022). 

During World War Two, French sculptor Ossip Zadkine, in self-exile in New York, lived with her and mentored her artistic career. In 1942, several ceramicists trained her in ceramics: Anne T. Wright, William Suoini, Catherine Yarrow, C. Paul Freigang, and others. She was the subject of many portraits by artists including Zadkine, Maya Deren,  and Tusnelda Sanders.  
From the 1950s she became increasingly active in preserving Greenwich Village, notably Milligan and Patchin Places, working alongside Jane Jacobs, Doris Diether and Ruth Wittenberg among others.
In 1987, daughter Kiske joined a Monastery of St. Clare as Sister Catherine Kiske until her death in 2022.

Diagnosed with mouth cancer, she died of pneumonia in November 1989.

References

Bibliography 

Janeway, Carol. Ceramics and Potterymaking for Everyone. (New York: Tudor Publishing Co.) 1950.

Janeway, Carol. Ceramic Brushes: their selection, use and care. (New York: Delta Brush Mfg. Corp) 1952.

Jenssen, Victoria, "Carol Janeway's Fanciful Doorknobs," in O Pioneers! Women Ceramic Artists 1925 - 1960. ed. Ezra Shales (Alfred, NY: Alfred Ceramic Art Museum) 2015, pp.39-41.

Jenssen, Victoria, foreword by Pat Kirkham, The Art of Carol Janeway: A Tile & Ceramics Career with Georg Jensen Inc. and Ossip Zadkine in 1940s Manhattan. (Friesen Press) 2022.

List, Larry. The Imagery of Chess Revisited. (New York: Isamu Noguchi Foundation and Garden Museum) 2005.

 American women ceramists
20th-century American ceramists
1913 births
1989 deaths
20th-century American women artists
20th-century ceramists